Ramphis libanoticus is a moth in the family Cosmopterigidae. It is found in Greece, Crete, Cyprus and Asia Minor (including Lebanon).

The wingspan is 9–11 mm. Adults are on wing from May to July and in October.

The larvae feed on Salvia triloba. They mine the leaves of their host plant.

References

Moths described in 1969
Cosmopteriginae
Moths of Europe
Moths of Asia